The 131st Engineer Battalion "Ticino" is an inactive military engineer unit of the Italian Army last based in Novara in Piedmont. The battalion was formed in 1958 and assigned to the Armored Division "Centauro". In 1975 the battalion was named for the Ticino river and received the number 131st, which had been used by the 131st Engineer Company that served with the 131st Armored Division "Centauro" during the Tunisian Campaign of World War II. With the name and number the battalion was also assigned the flag and traditions of the 9th Engineer Regiment, which had been active between 1926 and 1943. In 1986 the Armored Division "Centauro" was disbanded and the battalion was assigned to the 3rd Army Corps. In 1993 the battalion was disbanded and part of its personnel joined the 10th Engineer Regiment.

History

World War II

9th Engineer Regiment 
On 1 October 1922 the 9th Army Corps Engineer Grouping was formed in Trani, which received the Sappers Battalion and the Telegraphers Battalion of the XI Army Corps, and a miners company from the disbanded Miners Engineer Regiment. The grouping consisted of a command, a sappers-miners battalion, a telegraphers battalion, a photo-electricians company, three dovecotes (in Brindisi, Ancona, and Taranto), and a depot. On 30 September 1926 the grouping was renamed 9th Engineer Regiment. On 28 October 1932 the regiment received the 9th Company/ V Battalion from the disbanded 1st Radio-Telegraphers Regiment.

For the Second Italo-Ethiopian War the regiment mobilized in March 1935 a Mixed Engineer Company, the 60th Sapper Company, and the 24th Connections Company. The latter two companies were disbanded after their return to Italy in August 1936, while the Mixed Engineer Company remained in Massawa in Eritrea. At the end of 1936 the regiment consisted of a command, an engineer battalion, a telegraphers battalion, two dovecotes (in Brindisi and Taranto), and a depot in Trani, as well as the Mixed Engineer Company in Massawa. In January 1937 the telegraphers battalion was renamed connections battalion. On 21 October 1937 the regiment's depot helped form the 21st Engineer Regiment, which was raised for service in Libya.

With the outbreak of World War II the regiment's depot began to mobilize new units:

 VIII Army Corps Engineer Battalion (for the XVI Army Corps)
 XXIII Mixed Army Corps Engineer Battalion
 XXVI Engineer Battalion
 XXXVI Mixed Connections Battalion
 CCI Mixed Engineer Battalion (for the 1st CC.NN. Division "23 Marzo")
 and many smaller units

The XXVI Engineer Battalion fought on the Eastern Front and was awarded a Bronze Medal of Military Valour for its conduct and sacrifice. The regiment was disbanded on 14 September 1943 by invading German forces after the announcement of the Armistice of Cassibile on 8 September 1943. In 1944 the Italian Co-Belligerent Army reformed the regiment as a training center for engineer troops. The regiment was disbanded in 1945 after the war had ended.

131st Engineer Company 
On 5 June 1936 a Mixed Engineer Platoon was formed for the I Motor-mechanized Brigade. On 15 July 1937 the platon was expanded to Mixed Engineer Company and on the same date the brigade was renamed I Armored Brigade. On 20 April 1939 the brigade was renamed 131st Armored Division "Centauro" and the company was renamed 131st Mixed Engineer Company. The personnel for the company was trained by the 7th Engineer Regiment in Florence.
In 1940 the 131st Armored Division "Centauro" fought in the Greco-Italian War and in 1941 it participated in the Invasion of Yugoslavia. In October 1942 the division was transferred to Libya to participate in the Western Desert Campaign. The division did not participate in the Second Battle of El Alamein and the first units of the division arrived at the front during the retreat from Egypt in late 1942.

In early 1943 the 131st Mixed Engineer Company was split to form the 131st Engineer Company and the 231st Connections Company, which both entered the newly formed XXXI Mixed Engineer Battalion. In 1943 the Centauro participated in the Tunisian Campaign and fought in the Battle of El Guettar, where it was severely decimated. From 7 April 1943 the division's remaining personnel and equipment were assigned to the 16th Infantry Division "Pistoia". On 18 April 1943 the Centauro was declared lost due to wartime events.

Cold War 
On 1 May 1952 an engineer company was raised for the Armored Brigade "Centauro". On 1 April 1958 the company moved to Bellinzago Novarese and entered newly formed Engineer Battalion "Centauro", which was formed for the Armored Division "Centauro". The battalion consisted of a command, command platoon, and one engineer company. In November 1963 the battalion expanded the Command Platoon to Command and Park Company, and added the 2nd Engineer Company.

During the 1975 army reform the army disbanded the regimental level and newly independent battalions were granted for the first time their own flags. During the reform engineer battalions were named for a lake if they supported a corps or named for a river if they supported a division or brigade. On 21 October 1975 the Engineer Battalion "Centauro" was renamed 131st Engineer Battalion "Ticino" and assigned the flag and traditions of the 9th Engineer Regiment. The battalion also received all the traditions of the engineer units that served with the Centauro division. The battalion consisted of a command, a command and park company, and two engineer companies and remained assigned to the Armored Division "Centauro".

In 1986 the Italian Army disbanded the divisional level and placed brigades under direct command of its Army Corps. On 1 November 1986 the command of the Armored Division "Centauro" was disbanded and the battalion was assigned to the 3rd Army Corps' Engineer Command as 131st Sappers Battalion "Ticino".

On 10 January 1987 the battalion added a third engineer company, and on 22 January the Command and Park Company split into the Command and Services Company, and the Special Equipment Company. On 10 June 1993 the 131st Engineer Battalion "Ticino" was disbanded and the flag of the 9th Engineer Regiment was transferred on 6 June 1993 to the Shrine of the Flags in the Vittoriano in Rome. On 16 August 1993 part of the personnel of the battalion were used to reform the 10th Engineer Regiment.

References

Engineer Regiments of Italy